Ryc - is a Polish coat of arms. It was used by the Ryc and Rydz szlachta families.

History

Blazon
The Coat of arms Ryc is a Coat of arms of Wieniawa variation.

Notable bearers

Notable bearers of this coat of arms include:
 Edward Rydz-Śmigły, Inspector General of the Armed Forces of Poland

Gallery

See also
 Polish heraldry
 Heraldic family
 List of Polish nobility coats of arms

Bibliography
 Juliusz Karol Ostrowski: Księga herbowa rodów polskich. Warszawa, 1897-1906.

Ryc
Coats of arms with bison